Hamburger Stand, is a regional fast food chain in the western United States.  Besides its low-cost burgers, the restaurant's menu features items from its sister companies Wienerschnitzel and Tastee-Freez at some of its locations. It has locations in Arizona, California, Colorado, and Wyoming.

History
In 1979, Wienerschnitzel attempted to broaden its offerings and added hamburgers to its menus. However, with little success into the 1980s, the company (which was eventually renamed to the Galardi Group) started two new chains in 1983, The Original Hamburger Stand and Weldon's gourmet hamburgers (which was cast off in the 1990s). Poorly performing Wienerschnitzel locations were replaced with The Original Hamburger Stands in locations such as the Denver area. The original cost of the hamburgers, french fries, and drinks were all 39 cents each.

See also
 List of hamburger restaurants

References

External links
 Hamburger Stand website

Economy of the Southwestern United States
Fast-food chains of the United States
Regional restaurant chains in the United States
Fast-food hamburger restaurants
Hot dog restaurants in the United States